Ermanno Fumagalli (born 23 March 1982) is an Italian professional footballer who plays as a goalkeeper for  club ACR Messina.

Club career
Born in Treviglio, Fumagalli started his career in U.S. Fiorenzuola, made his debut in 1999–2000 season.

He was part of Avellino team who won the 2012–13 Lega Pro Prima Divisione Group B.

On 27 July 2021, he joined Seregno Calcio.

On 7 January 2022, he moved to Viterbese.

On 5 January 2023, Fumagalli signed with ACR Messina.

Honours
Avelino
 Lega Pro Prima Divisione: 2012–13 (Girone B)

References

External links
 
 

1982 births
Living people
People from Treviglio
Footballers from Lombardy
Italian footballers
Association football goalkeepers
Serie C players
Serie D players
U.S. Fiorenzuola 1922 S.S. players
A.S.D. Fanfulla players
A.C.R. Messina players
S.S. Teramo Calcio players
A.S. Melfi players
Valenzana Mado players
A.S.D. Progreditur Marcianise players
S.S. Juve Stabia players
U.S. Avellino 1912 players
Casertana F.C. players
A.S. Pro Piacenza 1919 players
Piacenza Calcio 1919 players
Calcio Foggia 1920 players
U.S. 1913 Seregno Calcio players
U.S. Viterbese 1908 players